, also known as 

The Japanese board game of shogi attracted Kurushima's interest; and he was recognized in his own time as a master player.  Among shogi players, he continues today to be well known for seven "puzzle ring" gambits with subsequent sequenced maneuvers—including the "silver puzzle ring."

In his lifetime, he was recognized among the most prominent intellectuals. His mathematical gift was highly esteemed.  Kurushima, like most of his contemporaries, was very interested in the mathematical problems involved in "magic squares."

Selected works
Kurushima's published writings are few.

   OCLC 033747221
  OCLC 033745707
  OCLC 033746085
  OCLC 033745451

See also
 Sangaku, the custom of presenting mathematical problems, carved in wood tablets, to the public in shinto shrines
 Soroban, a Japanese abacus
 Japanese mathematics

Notes

References 
 Endō Toshisada (1896). . Tōkyō: _.  OCLC 122770600
 Selin, Helaine. (1997).   Encyclopaedia of the History of Science, Technology, and Medicine in Non-Western Cultures. Dordrecht: Kluwer/Springer. ;   OCLC 186451909
 David Eugene Smith and Yoshio Mikami. (1914).   A History of Japanese Mathematics. Chicago: Open Court Publishing.   OCLC 1515528 -- note alternate online, full-text copy at archive.org

External links
 Shogi, Kuroshima's "Silver Puzzle Ring" gambit

18th-century Japanese mathematicians
Year of birth unknown
1757 deaths
Japanese writers of the Edo period